Carillo is a surname. Notable people with the surname include:

 Andrés Carillo (born 1980), Cuban fencer
 Frank Carillo (born 1950), American musician
 Luigi Carillo (born 1996), Italian footballer
 Maria Barbara Carillo (1625–1721), woman burned at the stake during the Spanish Inquisition
 Mario Carillo (1883–1958), Italian actor
 Mary Carillo (born 1957), American writer, sportscaster, and former women's tennis player

See also
 Carillo Gritti (1942–2016), Brazilian Roman Catholic bishop
 Carrillo (disambiguation)

Italian-language surnames